Queen Charlotte was a French prize that first appeared in British on-line records in 1799. She was a West Indiaman. She was burnt in 1805.

Career
Queen Charlotte first appeared in Lloyd's Register (LR) in 1799.

Captain John Pollock acquired a letter of marque on 24 August 1799. 
Captain William Dalton acquired a letter of marque on 17 September 1800.
Captain Peter Clark acquired a letter of marque on 5 May 1805.

In March 1805 Queen Charlotte was reported off "Scicily" (Isles of Scilly). She was returning from Suriname. She was leaky and her cargo had been damaged.

Fate
Queen Charlotte was burnt off Dungeness on 2 April 1805.

Citations

1790s ships
Captured ships
Age of Sail merchant ships of England
Maritime incidents in 1805